Tami L. Gouveia is a former State Representative who represented the 14th Middlesex District in the Massachusetts House of Representatives. She represented the towns of Concord and Carlisle, and parts of the towns of Acton and Chelmsford.

Gouveia served on the Joint Committee on Children, Families and Persons with Disabilities, the Joint Committee on Consumer Protection and Professional Licensure, the Joint Committee on Export Development, and Joint Committee on Mental Health, Substance Use and Recovery.

Tami grew up in Lowell. Her mother and great-grandmother worked in the mills along the Merrimack River. She graduated from the Boston University School of Social Work with dual degrees in social work and public health in 2001. She has a 25-year career in social work, and has worked at the Greater Lawrence Community Health Center. She is a single parent.

In 2021, she announced her candidacy for Lieutenant Governor for the election in 2022. She supports health care for all.

See also
 2021–2022 Massachusetts legislature

References

External links 
 Gouveia Legislative website
 Gouveia Campaign website

21st-century American politicians
21st-century American women politicians
Living people
Democratic Party members of the Massachusetts House of Representatives
Mount Holyoke College alumni
People from Acton, Massachusetts
Women state legislators in Massachusetts
Year of birth missing (living people)